Solute carrier organic anion transporter family member 1B3 (SLCO1B3) also known as organic anion-transporting polypeptide 1B3 (OATP1B3) is a protein that in humans is encoded by the SLCO1B3 gene.

OATP1B3 is a 12-transmembrane domain influx transporter. Normally expressed in the liver, the transporter functions to uptake large, non-polar drugs and hormones from the portal vein.

Clinical significance 
OATP1B3 has also been identified as a transporter aberrantly expressed in prostate cancer and implicated in prostate cancer progression. Increasing mRNA expression of OATP1B3 was also correlated to prostate cancer Gleason score.

In addition, lower expression of OATP1B3 mRNA was also detected in testicular cancer.

Substrates
Small molecules that are transported by SLCO1B3 include:

 Amanitin
 Atrasentan
 Bilirubin
 Bosentan
 BQ-123
 Bromsulphthalein (BSP)
 CDCA-NBD
 Cholate (CA)
 Cholecystokinin octapeptide (CCK-8)
 Dehydroepiandroserone-3-sulfate (DHEAS)
 Deltorphin II
 Demethylphalloin
 Digoxin
 Docetaxel
 [D-penicillamine2,5]enkephalin (DPDPE)
 Enalapril
 Estradiol-17β-glucuronide 5–25
 Estrone-3-sulfate
 Fexofenadine
 Fluvastatin
 Fluo-3
 Glutathione (GSH)
 Glycocholate (GCA)
 Glycoursodeoxycholate (GUDCA)
 Irinotecan
 Leukotriene C4 (LTC4)
 Methotrexate
 Microcystin
 Monoglyucuronosyl
 Olmesartan
 Ouabain
 Paclitaxel
 Phalloidin
 Pitavastatin
 Rifampicin
 Ro 48-5033 (Bosentan metabolite)
 Rosuvastatin
 SN-38
 Taurocholate (TCA)
 Taurochenodeoxycholate (TCDCA)
 Taurodeoxycholate (TDCA)
 Tauroursodeoxycholate (TUDCA)
 Telmisartan
 Thyroxine (T4)
 TR-14035
 Triiodothyronine (T3)
 Valsartan

See also
 Solute carrier family

References

Further reading

Solute carrier family